Fedor Ivanovič Černych (born 21 May 1991) is a professional footballer who plays as a forward for AEL Limassol. Born in Russia, he plays for the Lithuania national team.

Career
Černych was born in Moscow into a Russian family of Lithuanian descent. When his parents broke up, he went to live in Vilnius, Lithuania with his maternal grandparents.

In 2009, Černych signed a contract with Dnepr Mogilev.

Černych was loaned in 2012 to Naftan Novopolotsk when Dnepr Mogilev was relegated to the lower league.

In 2014, he signed for Polish club Górnik Łęczna. In an interview, he said that in Poland most of training was devoted to fitness.

On 26 January 2018, he signed with the Russian Premier League club Dynamo Moscow. On 31 March 2018, he scored his first goal for Dynamo, securing a 2–1 victory over Arsenal Tula. On 21 October 2018, he scored the only goal of the game to help Dynamo defeat Zenit Saint Petersburg, which was leading the league at the time.

On 21 August 2019, Fedor was loaned to FC Orenburg. 

On 8 September 2020, his contract with Dynamo Moscow was dissolved by mutual consent.

On 17 September 2020, he returned to former club Jagiellonia Białystok.

On 8 January 2023, Cypriot side AEL Limassol announced reaching an agreement in principle to sign Černych until June 2024, with an option for another year, with the move to be finalized following a medical examination.

Career statistics

Club

International

Scores and results list Lithuania's goal tally first, score column indicates score after each Černych goal.

Honours

Club
Naftan Novopolotsk
Belarusian Cup: 2011–12

Individual
 Lithuanian Footballer of the Year: 2016, 2017

References

External links
 
 
 

1991 births
Living people
Footballers from Moscow
Lithuanian footballers
Lithuania international footballers
Russian footballers
Russian people of Lithuanian descent
Association football forwards
FC Dnepr Mogilev players
FC Naftan Novopolotsk players
Górnik Łęczna players
Jagiellonia Białystok players
FC Dynamo Moscow players
FC Orenburg players
AEL Limassol players
Belarusian Premier League players
Ekstraklasa players
Russian Premier League players
Cypriot First Division players
Lithuanian expatriate footballers
Expatriate footballers in Belarus
Expatriate footballers in Poland
Expatriate footballers in Cyprus
Lithuanian expatriate sportspeople in Cyprus